"Jo Tu Na Mila" is a 2018 Pakistani song. It was composed and recorded by Asim Azhar with lyrics written by Kunaal Verma.

Release and success 
The song was released by VYRL Originals on YouTube on 20 November, 2018. The song crossed 15 million views within few days of its release. It received highest views for a Pakistani song in one day on YouTube. The song completed 100 million views on YouTube on 4 May 2020.

In 2020, the song was accused of copying the melody of "A Town with an Ocean View," a song by Japanese composer Joe Hisaishi featured in the Studio Ghibli film Kiki's Delivery Service.

Music video 
The song's music video, directed by Yasir Jaswal, features Asim Azhar, Iqra Aziz and Waleed Khalid. The video begins with aerial shot of city, and shows Azhar following his girlfriend who is on a date with another man. After following for a while, he chooses to leave, and is finally seen burning pictures of the two of them, ready to move on from the relationship.

Accolades

Credits and personnel 
 Singer: Asim Azhar
 Director: Yasir Jaswal
 Starring: Iqra Aziz and Waleed Khalid
 Composer: Asim Azhar
 Music Producer: Qasim Azhar
 Lyrics: Kunaal Verma
 Co-Produced by Haider Ali
 Co-Composer by Hasan Ali
 Mixed by Chris "TEK" O Ryan
 Mastered by Joe Bozzi
 D.O.P: Farhan Hafeez 
 Gaffer: Asif Hasan
 Focus Puller: Waqas Younis
 Wardrobe & Styling: Ehtesham Ansari
 Hair & Makeup: Nauman & Aqeel at Toni & Guy Production
 Design: Zain Khan at Cinescapes
 Line Producer: Zuhaib Fayyaz
 Producer: Waqas Hasan
 Post: JaswalFilms
 VFX: ProVision Post

Credits source

References 

2018 songs
Pakistani songs
Urdu-language songs
Asim Azhar songs